The 2015 European Games were held in Baku, Azerbaijan, from 12 June 2015 to 28 June 2015. 5,898 athletes participated in 253 events in 20 sports.

{| id="toc" class="toc" summary="Contents"
|-
| style="text-align:center;" colspan=3|Contents
|-
|
Archery
Athletics
Badminton
Basketball (3x3)
Beach soccer
Boxing
Canoe sprint
Cycling
|valign=top|
Diving
Fencing
Gymnastics
Judo
Karate
Sambo
Shooting
Swimming
|valign=top|
Synchronised swimming
Table tennis
Taekwondo
Triathlon
Volleyball
Water polo
Wrestling
|-
| style="text-align:center;" colspan="3"| References       External links
|}


Archery

Athletics

Badminton

Basketball (3x3)

Beach soccer

Boxing

Men's

Women's

Canoe sprint

Men

Notes
  Miklós Dudás of Hungary originally won the gold medal, but were later disqualified due to doping violations.

Women

Cycling

Road cycling

Mountain biking

BMX

Diving

Men

Women

Fencing

Men's

Women's

Gymnastics

Acrobatic

Women's groups

Mixed pairs

Aerobic

Artistic gymnastics

Men's events

Women's events

Rhythmic gymnastics

Individual

Group

Trampoline

Judo

Men's events

Women's events

Karate

Men

Women

Sambo

Men's events

Women's events

Shooting

Men's events

Women's events

Mixed events

Swimming

Men's events

Women's events

Mixed events

Synchronised swimming

Table tennis

Taekwondo

Men

Women

Triathlon

Volleyball

Water polo

Wrestling

Men's freestyle

Men's Greco-Roman

Women's Freestyle

References
Specific

External links

Medalists
European Games 2015